Liam Williams (born 26 May 1992) is a Welsh professional boxer who challenged for the WBO interim light-middleweight title in 2017 and the WBO middleweight title in 2021. At regional level, he held the British and Commonwealth light-middleweight titles between 2014 and 2016 and the British middleweight title from 2018 to October 2020.

Early life
Williams was born in Church Village and now lives in Clydach Vale in the Rhondda Valleys. He worked as a roofer before becoming a professional boxer.

Amateur career
In an amateur career which he claims began at age nine, Williams says he won 44 out of 49 fights, gaining many awards in Britain and Europe. "I won seven Welsh titles at all age levels, including the 2011 Senior ABAs when I was just 18. I beat Warren Sinden, who’s now a pro, by a wide points margin in the 75KG final."

Professional career
Williams turned professional as a light-middleweight in 2011. Aged 18, he won every round against the more experienced Ryan Clark and won the vacant Commonwealth light-middleweight title in November 2014 with a 2nd-round-stoppage win over Michael Lomax.

Williams vs. Carslaw 
The following year, he added the vacant British national title by stopping Kris Carslaw in the second round of their bout at Manchester Arena.

Williams vs. Corcoran 
He retained both titles in defeating a previously unbeaten Gary Corcoran at the Ice Arena Wales on 16 July 2016 with an 11th-round stoppage in what has been described as a gruesome grudge match.

Williams vs. Smith 
Williams was controversially defeated by former WBO light-middleweight world champion Liam Smith on 8 April 2017 at the Manchester Arena. Owing to incorrect weight for the bout, Smith was ineligible to inherit the interim WBO light-middleweight world title (held by Canelo Álvarez who is moving to a higher weight and expected to vacate the title).

Williams vs. Fox 
On 21 December 2019 Williams fought Alantez Fox, ranked #2 by the WBO and #12 by the IBF at middleweight. Williams won the fight with a fifth-round TKO.

Williams vs. Robinson 
On 10 October 2020 Williams defeated Andrew Robinson with a first-round knockout.

Williams vs. Andrade 
On 17 April 2021, Williams unsuccessfully challenged undefeated WBO middleweight champion Demetrius Andrade for his world title, losing a unanimous decision with scores of 118–109, 118–109, 116–111.

Williams vs. Eubank Jr 
On 5 February 2022 Williams fought Chris Eubank Jr, ranked #1 by the WBA, #3 by the WBC, #5 by the WBO and #7 by The Ring. Eubank Jr scored four knockdowns en route to a 12-round unanimous decision victory, the judges scoring it 117-109, 116-109 and 116-108 for Eubank Jr.

Professional boxing record

References

External links

Liam Williams - Profile, News Archive & Current Rankings at Box.Live

1992 births
Light-middleweight boxers
Living people
Middleweight boxers
People from Church Village
Sportspeople from Rhondda Cynon Taf
Welsh male boxers